Emmanuel Okoli (born 13 November 1973) is a retired Nigerian sprinter who specialized in the 400 metres. Okoli finished fifth in 4 x 400 metres relay at the 1992 Summer Olympics with teammates Hassan Bosso, Sunday Bada and Udeme Ekpeyong.

References

External links

1973 births
Living people
Nigerian male sprinters
Igbo sportspeople
Athletes (track and field) at the 1992 Summer Olympics
Athletes (track and field) at the 1994 Commonwealth Games
Olympic athletes of Nigeria
Commonwealth Games competitors for Nigeria
20th-century Nigerian people